Air Freight NZ was a cargo airline based in Auckland, New Zealand. It operated scheduled overnight cargo services on behalf of owner Freightways, and is supported by sister company Fieldair holdings. Domestic charter services are also operated. Its main base is Auckland Airport, with hubs at Christchurch International Airport and Palmerston North International Airport.

History 
The airline started operations in July 1989, headed by William (Bill) Olsen. Its primary contract was with the courier division of Freightways Group. It is now wholly owned by Freightways Express. The Convair carries 11 cargons of freight on each trip. Despite its age the Convair is a great performer capable of transporting seven and a half tonnes of freight at 300 kts.

Accidents and incidents
3 October 2003: Air Freight NZ Convair 580, ZK-KFU, was lost off radar near the Kapiti Coast. Fatalities: 2.
31 July 1989: Air Freight NZ Convair 580, ZK-FTB, descended shortly after takeoff from Auckland Airport, colliding with a bank before crashing into Manukau Harbour. Fatalities: 3.

Destinations 
Air Freight NZ operated freight services to the following destinations in April 2013: Auckland, Christchurch and Palmerston North. Air Freight operated seven northbound flights per night from Christchurch Airport.

Fleet 
The former Air Freight NZ fleet consisted of the following aircraft (at June 2014):

4 Convair 580
1 Convair 5800

Aircraft Fleet 1989-2016

See also
 List of defunct airlines of New Zealand
 History of aviation in New Zealand

References

External links
 Fieldair

Defunct airlines of New Zealand
Airlines established in 1985
Cargo airlines of New Zealand
New Zealand companies established in 1985